Mazahir Uloom is an Islamic seminary located in Saharanpur, Uttar Pradesh. Started in November 1866 by Sa'ādat Ali Faqīh, and developed further by Mazhar Nanautawi and Ahmad Ali Saharanpuri; it is regarded as the second most influential and major Deobandi seminary in India. The earliest graduates of the seminary include famous Hadīth scholar Khalil Ahmad Saharanpuri. In 1983, the seminary split into two with the establishment of Mazahir Uloom Jadeed as a new independent seminary. Since then the seminary has been named as Mazahir Uloom Waqf Qadeem.

The incumbent rector of the seminary is Muḥammad Saeedi.

History
Mazāhir Uloom was established as "Mazhar Uloom"; on 9 November 1866, six months after the foundation of the Deoband seminary. Its founding figures included Ahmad Ali Saharanpuri, Mazhar Nanautawi, Qādhi Fazlur Rahmān and Sa’adat Ali Faqih. Mazahir Uloom is thought to be the second major madrasa after Darul Uloom Deoband.

The first generation teachers, apart from the founders; include, Aḥmad Hasan Kanpuri, Sa'adat Hussain Bihari, Sakhāwat Ali Ambethwi and Muḥammad Siddīq. The first generation students include Khalil Ahmad Saharanpuri, Mushtāq Aḥmad Anbethwi and Qamruddīn Sahāranpuri. In Muharram 1338 AH, the seminary established its Darul Ifta (the fatwa institute). The seminary's jurists include Ashfāqur Rahmān Kāndhlawi, Mahmood Hasan Gangohi, Abdul Qayyūm Raipuri and Muḥammad Shuaib Bastawi.

Recent developments
Following the split of Darul Uloom Deoband in 1982; this seminary also bifurcated into two and Mazahir Uloom Jadeed took birth as an independent offshoot in 1983.

Program
The seminary teaches the dars-e-nizami curriculum. The former rector of the seminary Abdul Latīf wrote a detailed defense of the dars-e-nizami curriculum; when some scholars asked the syllabus to be updated. The seminary has changed few books in the curriculum timely, but they did not modify it completely and they do not agree with the changes, or systems otherwise.

Administration
Mazāhir Uloom follows the dogma of Sunni Islam and the jurisprudence of Abu Hanifa. It adheres to the Chishti order of Sufism, following Rashid Ahmad Gangohi and Khalil Ahmad Saharanpuri. The seminary focuses on educational purposes only. It has stayed away from discussing politics.

The management of the seminary was controlled by its local members. Owing to their differences, Rashid Ahmad Gangohi was appointed the senior patron of the seminary in 1896. Gangohi resigned from the position in 1319 AH; and an executive council called "Majlis Shūra Sarparastān" was formed to look after the seminary affairs on 3 January 1903. The first such council included Abdur Rahīm Raipuri, Ashraf Ali Thanwi and Zulfiqar Ali Deobandi.

Scholars such as Abdur Rahīm Raipuri, Ashraf Ali Thanwi, Mahmud Hasan Deobandi, Fazlur Rahmān Sahāranpuri, Khalil Ahmad Saharanpuri, Abdul Qadir Raipuri, Aashiq Elāhi Meerthi, Muhammad Ilyas Kandhlawi, Muhammad Zakariya Kandhlawi, Muhammad Yusuf Kandhlawi, Inamul Hasan Kandhlawi, Iftikhar-ul-Hasan Kandhlawi, Mahmood Hasan Gangohi and Ghulam Mohammad Vastanvi have been the members of the executive council.

Publications
Mazahir Uloom publishes Ā'īna-e-Mazāhir-e-Uloom as a monthly journal. The religious edicts issued by the seminary's Dārul Ifta are kept in record. The edicts issued by Khalil Ahmad Saharanpuri were compiled by Muhammad Zakariyyah Kāndhlawi, and published as Fatāwa Khalīliya.

Rectors
Sa'ādat Ali Saharanpuri was appointed as the first rector of the seminary. Following the division and establishment of Mazahir Uloom Jadeed; Muzaffar Hussain who was the last rector of the unified seminary; occupied on the position at the Mazahir Uloom till his death in 2003. He was succeeded by Muḥammad Saeedi. In the early years of the seminary, the administrative tasks of the seminary were also performed by a vice-rector; Abd al-Wāhid Khān served on the position from 1881 to 1896, and thus there appears to be confusion in dates, until a permanent position of rector was adopted which follows in sequence after Munshi Maqbool Aḥmad.

The following is a list of seminary's rectors.

Notable alumni

Alumni include: 
 Khalil Ahmad Saharanpuri
 Mahmood Hasan Gangohi
 Muhammad Zakariya Kandhlawi
 Saeed Ahmad Palanpuri
 Zafar Ahmad Usmani

References

Bibliography

Further reading
 
 

Educational institutions established in 1866
Deobandi Islamic universities and colleges
Madrasas in India
Saharanpur
1866 establishments in India